Księginice may refer to the following places in Poland:
Księginice in Gmina Legnickie Pole, Legnica County in Lower Silesian Voivodeship (SW Poland)
Księginice in Gmina Lubin, Lubin County in Lower Silesian Voivodeship (SW Poland)
Księginice in Gmina Miękinia, Środa Śląska County in Lower Silesian Voivodeship (SW Poland)
Księginice in Gmina Trzebnica, Trzebnica County in Lower Silesian Voivodeship (SW Poland)
Księginice in Gmina Kobierzyce, Wrocław County in Lower Silesian Voivodeship (SW Poland)